Open Educational Resource (OER) Universitas is a collaboration of post-secondary educational institutions  and other organisations with the aim of providing opportunities to learn from open educational resources and gain credit at costs lower than traditional degrees. The conceptual framework underpinning 
ENGAGEDe in free learning, and receive formal accreditation from participating universities. 
It is possible to use OER Universitas partners as an alternative paths to earning a degree

Founding Anchor Partners
The founding anchor partners of the OER Universitas are:
 Athabasca University (Canada)
 Dr. Babasaheb Ambedkar Open University (India)
 Nelson Marlborough Institute of Technology (New Zealand)
 NorthTec (New Zealand)
 Otago Polytechnic (New Zealand)
 Southern New Hampshire University (USA)
 SUNY Empire State College US
 Thompson Rivers University (Canada)
 University of Canterbury (New Zealand)
 University of South Africa (South Africa)
 University of Southern Queensland (Australia)
 University of Wollongong (Australia)
 OER Foundation (non-teaching)
 BCcampus (Canada, non-teaching).

References
Fostering social inclusion through open educational resources (OER)- Conole, Gráinne; Distance Education33.2 (Aug 2012): p. 131-134.

External links 

 OER universitas web site

International college and university associations and consortia
Open educational resources